"Dreaming People" is an English language 2010 single by Jay Smith, winner of Swedish Idol 2010. He performed it as the winner song in the final of the competition. So did the other finalist Minnah Karlsson on 10 December 2010.
The song is written by Christian Walz, Svante Halldin, Jakob Hazell and Sharon Vaughn. It was released as Smith's debut solo single shortly after the announcement of the Idol results. In its first week of release, it entered the Sverigetopplistan, the official Swedish Singles Chart, debuting at number 3 in week 51 (dated 24 December 2010).

Charts

Weekly charts

Year-end charts

References

2010 debut singles
2010 songs
Songs written by Sharon Vaughn
Songs written by Christian Walz
Songs written by Svante Halldin
Songs written by Jakob Hazell